The men's 1500 meter at the 2016 KNSB Dutch Single Distance Championships took place in Heerenveen at the Thialf ice skating rink on Monday 28 December 2015. There were 20 participants.

Statistics

Result

Source:

Referee: Jan Bolt. Starter: Raymond Micka  Start: 16:25 hr. Finish: 16:54 hr.

Draw

References

Single Distance Championships
2016 Single Distance